"Sommerfuggel i vinterland" (butterfly in winter land in English) is a famous Norwegian language song written, composed and sung by Norwegian artist Halvdan Sivertsen. A song about tolerance, it was the opening track on the album Ny og naken released in 1987, and later on in his compilation albums Hilsen Halvdan in 1991 and 40+ in 2005.

Cover versions
Gitarkameratene

Sivertsen also recorded the song with the super-group Gitarkameratene, made up of Sivertsen, Øystein Sunde, Jan Eggum and Lillebjørn Nilsen. The song on their debut album Grappa released in 1989.

Vinni version

During the Norwegian reality show Hver gang vi møtes broadcast on the Norwegian television station TV 2 in 2012, it was sung by Øyvind "Vinni" Sauvik in episode 1 of season 1 of the show dedicated Halvdan Sivertsen songs and made available on an EP on 27 January 2012 and hit #4 based on downloads. It was recorded in a studio setting and made available on 3 February 2012, hitting #1 on VG-lista the same week staying at #1 for 5 consecutive weeks. The song was also included in the compilation album containing 24 tracks from various shows of Hver gang vi møtes including "Sommerfuggel i vinterland". It was released on 5 March 2012, with the album making it to the top of the Norwegian Albums Chart for 2 weeks.

References

1987 songs
2012 singles
Norwegian-language songs
Number-one singles in Norway